Sri Venkateswara Cine Chitra  is an Indian motion picture production, and distribution established by B. V. S. N. Prasad, an Indian film producer. The company was founded in the year 2003 and is based in Hyderabad and had produced several successful Telugu films. In 2012, the production company announced a partnership with Reliance Entertainment. The first film in partnership with Reliance, Devudu Chesina Manushulu was released in August 2012. Designated partners of Sri Venkateswara Cine Chitra are Prasad and Bhogavalli Bapineedu.

History

In 2003 SVCC started their production career with the movie Ee Abbai Chala Manchodu, directed by Agathiyan, starring Ravi Teja, [[Sangeetha Krish and Vani. After a gap of a year, SVCC produced one of the biggest blockbuster hits of Tollywood, Chatrapathi, directed by S. S. Rajamouli starring Prabhas and Shriya Saran. SVCC uniquely paired in alternate movies with Ravi Teja and Prabhas for their next two movies, Khatarnak starring Ileana D'Cruz and Kajal Aggarwal. The production house gained its popularity, by selectiong new scripts always. Darling starring Prabhas was their third film together and this was also a hit at the box office. This was the second movie with Kajal Aggarwal. They paved way to many other huge movies like, Devudu Chesina Manushulu, Ongole Gitta etc.,. They made some movies like Sahasam, starring Gopichand, Taapsee Pannu, which was an action based historic film and it also created a new dimension for Gopichand's career. Attarintiki Daredi starring Pawan Kalyan, Samantha Ruth Prabhu and Pranitha Subhash is again a huge hit yet again at the box office. The movie was written and directed by the ace director  Trivikram Srinivas. Their films made their way to box office in the perfect way, Dohchay,Nannaku Prematho were also great at box office. The production house tried a new genre Comedy, starring Allari Naresh, Kruthika Jayakumar directed by G. Nageswara Reddy. Their latest film Radha, with Sharwanand and Lavanya Tripathi is again a flag bearing hit movie at box office.

Distribution

Sri Venkateswara Cine Chitra has also made a huge entry into distribution with Chatrapathi which is self-produced film. Later in 2011 Oosaravelli was also distributed by them. In recent times, S/O Satyamurthy was also distributed under SVCC banner.

Film production

Film distribution

References

External links
 
 

Film production companies based in Hyderabad, India
Mass media companies established in 2003
2003 establishments in Andhra Pradesh
Indian companies established in 2003